Newrybar is a small town located in the Northern Rivers Region of New South Wales, Australia. At the 2021 census, it had a permanent population of 532.

Demographics
The median age of persons in Newrybar was 47 years. There were more males than females, with 50.6% of the population male and 49.4% female. The average household size was 2.6 people per household.

References 

Towns in New South Wales
Ballina Shire
Byron Shire